Owtar Mahalleh-ye Shirabad (also Romanized as Owtār Maḩalleh-ye Shīrābād and Ūtār Maḩalleh-ye Shīrābād; also known as Ownār Maḩalleh) is a village in Haviq Rural District, Haviq District, Talesh County, Gilan Province, Iran. At the 2006 census, its population was 503, in 135 families.

References 

Populated places in Talesh County